The 2011 McNeese State Cowboys football team represented McNeese State University in the 2011 NCAA Division I FCS football season. The Cowboys were led by sixth-year head coach Matt Viator and played their home games at Cowboy Stadium. They are a member of the Southland Conference. They finished the season 6–5, 4–3 in Southland play to finish in third place.

Schedule

References

McNeese State
McNeese Cowboys football seasons
McNeese State Cowboys football